The Union Cycliste Internationale (UCI;) is the world governing body for sports cycling and oversees international competitive cycling events. The UCI is based in Aigle, Switzerland.

The UCI issues racing licenses to riders and enforces disciplinary rules, such as in matters of doping. The UCI also manages the classification of races and the points ranking system in various cycling disciplines including road and track cycling, mountain biking and BMX, for both men and women, amateur and professional. It also oversees the World Championships.

After the 2022 Russian invasion of Ukraine, the UCI said that Russian and Belarusian teams are forbidden from competing in international events. It also stripped both Russia and Belarus of scheduled events.

History 
UCI was founded in 1900 in Paris by the national cycling sports organisations of Belgium, the United States, France, Italy, and Switzerland. It replaced the International Cycling Association (ICA) by setting up in opposition in a row over whether Great Britain should be allowed just one team at world championships or separate teams representing England, Ireland, Scotland and Wales. Britain found itself outflanked and it was not able to join the UCI – under the conditions the UCI had imposed – until 1903.

There were originally 30 countries affiliated to the union. They did not have equal voting power and some had no vote at all. Votes were distributed by the number of tracks, or velodromes, that each nation claimed. France had 18 votes, the highest number, and Germany and Italy 14 each. Britain had eight, a number the writer Bill Mills said was acquired "by including many rather doubtful grass tracks."

In 1965, under the pressure of the IOC (the Olympics was then an amateur event), the UCI created two subsidiary bodies, the International Amateur Cycling Federation (Fédération Internationale Amateur de Cyclisme or FIAC) and the International Professional Cycling Federation (Fédération Internationale de Cyclisme Professionnel or FICP). The UCI assumed a role coordinating both bodies.

The FIAC was based in Rome, the FICP in Luxembourg, and the UCI in Geneva.

The FIAC was the bigger of the two organisations, with 127 member federations across all five continents. It was dominated by the countries of the Eastern Bloc which were amateur. The FIAC arranged representation of cycling at the Olympic Games, and FIAC cyclists competed against FICP members on only rare occasions. In 1992, the UCI reunified the FIAC and FICP, and merged them back into the UCI. The combined organisation then relocated to Aigle, close to the IOC in Lausanne.

In 2004, the UCI constructed a 200-metre velodrome at the new World Cycling Centre adjacent to its headquarters.

In September 2007 the UCI announced that it had decided to award ProTour status for the first time ever to an event outside of Europe; the Tour Down Under in Adelaide, Australia. The announcement followed negotiations between UCI President Pat McQuaid and South Australian Premier Mike Rann.

In 2013 Tracey Gaudry became the first woman appointed as vice president of the UCI.

After the 2022 Russian invasion of Ukraine, the UCI said that Russian and Belarusian teams are forbidden from competing in international events. It also stripped both Russia and Belarus of scheduled events.

World championships
The UCI organises cycling's world championships, administration of which it gives to member nations. The first championships were on the road and on the track. They were allocated originally to member nations in turn, on condition the country was deemed competent and that it could guarantee ticket sales. A nation given a championship or series of championships was required to pay the UCI 30 per cent of ticket receipts from the track and 10 per cent from the road. Of this, the UCI kept 30 per cent and gave the rest to competing nations in proportion to the number of events in which it competed. The highest gate money in this pre-war era was 600 000 francs in Paris in 1903.

There were originally five championships: amateur and professional sprint, amateur and professional road race, and professional Motor-paced racing. The road race was traditionally a massed start but did not have to be: Britain organised its road championship before the war as a time trial, the National Cyclists Union believing it best to run races against the clock, and without publicity before the start, to avoid police attention. Continental European organisers generally preferred massed races on circuits, fenced throughout or along the finish to charge for entry.

Records
The original records were on the track: unpaced, human-paced and mechanically paced. They were promoted for three classes of bicycle: solos, tandems and unusual machines such as what are now known as recumbents, on which the rider lies horizontal. Distances were imperial and metric, from 440 yards and 500 metres to 24 hours. The UCI banned recumbents in competitions and in record attempts on 1 April 1934. Later changes included restrictions on riding positions of the sort that affected Graeme Obree in the 1990s and the banning in 2000 of all frames that did not have a seat tube.

Rainbow jersey 
The winner of a UCI World Championship title is awarded a rainbow jersey, white with five coloured bands on the chest.  This jersey can be worn in only the discipline, specialty and category of competition in which it was awarded, and expires on the day before the following world championship event.  Former champions are permitted to wear rainbow piping on the cuffs and collar of their clothing.

Secretariat

Presidents

Controversies

Helmet use in road racing 
For decades, professional road cyclists refused to wear helmets. The first serious attempt by the UCI to introduce compulsory helmet use was the 1991 Paris–Nice race, which resulted in a riders' strike, and the UCI abandoned the idea.

After the death of Andrei Kivilev in the 2003 Paris–Nice, new rules were introduced on 5 May 2003, with the 2003 Giro d'Italia being the first major race affected. The 2003 rules allowed for discarding the helmets during final climbs of at least 5 kilometres in length; subsequent revisions made helmet use mandatory at all times.

Bribery and doping 
The UCI was accused of accepting a bribe in the 1990s to introduce the keirin, a track cycling race, into the Olympics. An investigation by the BBC claims that the UCI was paid approximately $3,000,000 by Japanese sources to add the race to the Olympic programme, something denied by the UCI.

When Floyd Landis confessed to using performance-enhancing drugs throughout his career in May 2010, he alleged that the UCI had accepted a bribe from Lance Armstrong to cover up an EPO positive after the 2001 Tour de Suisse.

Discussing doping in 2012, UCI president Pat McQuaid emphasised the fact that his organisation was "the first entity to introduce blood tests, the first sport to introduce the test for EPO".

Doping and defamation lawsuits  

The UCI has sued or threatened to sue several cyclists, journalists, and writers for defamation after they accused it of corruption or other misdeeds related to doping. Many, though not all, of these suits are heard in the Est Vaudois district court of Vevey, Switzerland

In 2002 UCI sued Festina soigneur Willy Voet over claims in his book Breaking the Chain. In 2004 the UCI won the case, and in 2006 won the appeal. Voet had made various claims about UCI and Verbruggen's behavior related to the Laurent Brochard Lidocaine case at the 1997 UCI Road World Championships.

In 2006, according to Cycling News, the UCI contacted Greg LeMond after an interview he did in 2006 with L'Equipe, and threatened to sue him for defamation. LeMond mentioned the UCI-commissioned Vrijman report, as well as Operacion Puerto, and called the body "corrupt".

Another lawsuit was by Hein Verbruggen against WADA Chief Dick Pound in Swiss court regarding his comments about doping and the UCI. The lawsuit was settled by the parties in 2009.

In 2011, the UCI sued Floyd Landis in Switzerland after Landis accused the body of several misdeeds, including the aforementioned alleged coverup involving Lance Armstrong and the 2001 Tour de Suisse. In 2012 Cycling News reported that a District Court had ruled for UCI against Landis.

In 2012 UCI president Pat McQuaid and former president Hein Verbruggen, as well as the UCI itself, sued journalist Paul Kimmage in Switzerland for defamation. In 2013, the President of Cycling Federation of Russia called the UCI Ethics Committee to investigate Pat McQuaid actions after the UCI Licence Commission denied team Katusha a place in the 2013 WorldTour – the action which was promptly reversed. Kimmage had been a racer and had a long history of investigating doping in the sport, including a book and, more recent to the suit, articles for the Sunday Times and L'Equipe which discussed doping and UCI. Greg LeMond, David Walsh and others voiced their support for Kimmage and a legal defense fund was set up to assist him.

Sufferance of an international law violation 

Under approval of the UCI, the Free Rate Downhill Race took place in May 2015 on Crimea, an internationally recognised Ukrainian territory which was annexed by the Russian Federation in March 2014. By officially overseeing an international competition with Russian license on the Ukrainian peninsula, the UCI was the first and only international sports governing body which undermined the territorial integrity of Ukraine. Yet, in the aftermath of this "scandal of sports and international law" the UCI negotiated with the Cycling Federation of Ukraine and, in November 2015, announced to remove the Free Rate Downhill Race officially from the UCI international calendar.

Turkmenistan 
Turkmenistan's authoritarian leader Gurbanguly Berdimuhamedow was awarded the highest award of the Union Cycliste Internationale for his country's commitment to the sport.

Disciplines

Road racing

Men 
On top of having organized the Road World Championships since 1921, from 1989 until 2004, the UCI administered the UCI Road World Cup, a season-long competition incorporating all the major one-day professional road races. In 2005 this was replaced by the UCI ProTour series which initially included the Grand Tour road cycling stage races (the Tour de France, Giro d'Italia and Vuelta a España) and a wider range of other one-day and stage races.  However, the three Grand Tour races withdrew from the series, and in July 2008 all the major professional teams threatened to quit the series, putting its future in doubt. The ProTour was replaced as a ranking system the following year by the UCI World Ranking, which added the three Grand Tours, two early season stage races, and five more one-day classics to the 14 remaining ProTour events.

To expand the participation and popularity of professional road bicycle racing throughout the globe, the UCI develop a series of races collectively known as the UCI Continental Circuits for each region of the world.

Women 
The highest level teams in women's road cycling are the UCI Women's Teams.

The UCI has supported elite level competition for women since 1959 including the crowning of a Women's World Cycling Champion (Road Race) and beginning in 1994, honoring a Women's World Time Trial Champion at the women's time trial event. Since 2012 UCI Women's teams compete at the World Championships in the women's team time trial event

Since 1998, the UCI Women's Road World Cup has served as a season-long competition of elite-level one-day and stage race events.

Track cycling
The UCI Track Cycling World Championships for men and women offers individual and team championships in several track cycling disciplines. The UCI Track Cycling World Cup serves as a season-long competition of elite-level.

Para-cycling Track 

The UCI Para-cycling Track World Championships for men and women offers individual and team championships in several track cycling disciplines.

Cyclo-cross
Each UCI-sponsored event feeds into the season-long competition known as the UCI Cyclo-cross World Cup. In addition, a series of single-day events are held each year to determine the Cyclo-cross World Champion at the UCI Cyclo-cross World Championships.

Mountain bike racing
In mountain bike racing, the UCI Mountain Bike & Trials World Championships is the most important and prestigious competition each year. This includes the disciplines of cross-country and downhill. In addition, this event consists of world championship events for bike trials riding. In 2012 the first cross-country eliminator world championship was held in Saalfelden.

The UCI Mountain Bike World Cup is a series of races, held annually since 1991.

At the 2011 World Championships held in Champéry, Switzerland the UCI announced a controversial new sponsorship deal with the previously unheard of RockyRoads Network.

BMX racing
The season-long competition is known as the UCI BMX Supercross World Cup and the UCI BMX World Championships serves as the one-day world championships for BMX racing (bicycle motorcross) cycling.

Trials
Unlike other types of cycling disciplines, trials is a sport where the main factors are the stability and the control of the bike in extreme situations where speed also plays an important role.

The first UCI Trials World Championships took place in 1986. Fourteen years later, in 2000, the UCI Trials World Cup made its debut. The most World Champions titles have been won by riders from Belgium, France, Germany, Spain and Switzerland. The UCI Trials World Youth Games is the most important international event for boys and girls under 16 years old, the first edition of which took place in 2000.

Indoor cycling
The UCI sponsors world championships for artistic cycling and cycle ball at an annual event known as the UCI Indoor Cycling World Championships.

Membership

Continental confederations
The national federations form confederations by continent:
 Asian Cycling Confederation – ACC
 Union Européenne de Cyclisme – UEC (European Cycling Union)
 Oceania Cycling Confederation – OCC
 Confederación Panamericana de Ciclismo – COPACI (Pan American Cycling Confederation)
 Confédération Africaine de Cyclisme – CAC (African Cycling Confederation)

National federations

See also 
 The Cyclists' Alliance

References

External links
 
 UCI YouTube channel

 
IOC-recognised international federations
Cycle racing organizations
Sports organizations established in 1900
International sports bodies based in Switzerland
Aigle